Dene O'Kane (born 24 February 1963) is a former professional snooker player from Auckland, New Zealand.

Career 
O'Kane won the 1980 New Zealand Amateur Championship, and represented New Zealand at the 1982 IBSF World Snooker Championship, winning six of his nine group matches, but failing to qualify on  difference. He turned professional in 1984.

In his first professional tournament, the 1984 International Open, he won four qualifying matches, 5–2 against Maurice Parkin, 5–1 against Eddie McLaughlin, 5–4 against Jack Fitzmaurice and 5–4 against Mike Hallett, before losing 3–5 to Willie Thorne. Also in his debut season, he reached the quarter-finals of the 1985 British Open, and progressing through the qualifying rounds with four wins and a walkover, reached the last 32 of the 1985 World Snooker Championship, losing 4–10 to David Taylor.

He reached the quarter-finals of the World Championships in 1987 and 1992. He reached the final stages (last 32 or better) of the World Snooker Championship six times, but never in consecutive years. He was the runner-up in the 1989 Hong Kong Open, losing 8–9 to Mike Hallett after leading 8–6.

He first reached the top 32 in the world rankings for the 1985/1986 season, returning three years later. In 1991/1992 he reached his career high of 18. He remained in the top 32 until 1996/1997.

Having won £415,000 in prize money during his career, O'Kane started a career in real estate in 2007.

Performance and rankings timeline

Career finals

Ranking finals: 1

Team finals: 1

Amateur finals: 12 (8 titles)

References

External links 
 Profile on worldsnooker.com

New Zealand snooker players
1963 births
Living people
Competitors at the 2009 World Games
Sportspeople from Auckland